This is a list of German language exonyms for towns in Belgium. German is a minority language in Belgium, being especially used in the region of Arelerland.

Complete list of names

See also

German exonyms
List of European exonyms
Belgium
German
German